William Saavedra Valdés  (born October 23, 1981) is a Cuban professional baseball first baseman for Vegueros de Pinar del Río in the Cuban National Series.

Saavedra played for the Cuban national baseball team at the 2011 World Port Tournament, 2015 Pan American Games and 2017 World Baseball Classic.

References

External links

1993 births
Living people
Cuban baseball players
Baseball first basemen
Vegueros de Pinar del Rio players
Cocodrilos de Matanzas players
2017 World Baseball Classic players
Pan American Games bronze medalists for Cuba
Baseball players at the 2015 Pan American Games
Pan American Games medalists in baseball
Medalists at the 2015 Pan American Games
People from Pinar del Río